Tapestry is the second studio album by American singer-songwriter Carole King, released in 1971 on Ode Records and produced by Lou Adler. The lead singles from the album—"It's Too Late" and "I Feel the Earth Move"—spent five weeks at number one on both the Billboard Hot 100 and Easy Listening charts.

Tapestry has been certified 14× Platinum by the Recording Industry Association of America in the US, and has sold an estimated 30 million copies worldwide, making it one of the best-selling albums of all time. In 2000, it attained number 74 in Colin Larkin's All Time Top 1000 Albums, and in 2020, it was ranked number 25 on Rolling Stones list of the 500 greatest albums of all time. Tapestry won four Grammy Awards, including Album of the Year, Song of the Year and Record of the Year.

Production
King wrote or co-wrote all of the songs on the album, two of which had already been hits for other artists such as Aretha Franklin's "(You Make Me Feel Like) A Natural Woman" (in 1967), and The Shirelles' "Will You Love Me Tomorrow" (in 1960). King's ex-husband Gerry Goffin wrote the lyrics for three of the songs. James Taylor, who encouraged King to sing her own songs and who also played on Tapestry, had a number one hit with "You've Got a Friend," later in 1971. Two songs were co-written with Toni Stern: "It's Too Late" and "Where You Lead".

The album was recorded at A&M Recording Studios' Studio B during January 1971 with the support of Joni Mitchell and James Taylor, plus various experienced session musicians. Several of the musicians worked simultaneously on Taylor's Mud Slide Slim and the Blue Horizon album.

The cover photograph was taken by A&M staff photographer Jim McCrary at King's Laurel Canyon home. It shows her sitting in a window frame, holding a tapestry that she had hand-stitched herself, with her cat Telemachus at her feet.

Critical reception
{{Album ratings
| rev1 = AllMusic
| rev1Score = 
| rev2 = Christgau's Record Guide
| rev2Score = A−
| rev3 = ‘’The Encyclopedia of Popular Music| rev3Score = 
| rev4 = The Great Rock Discography| rev4Score = 8/10
| rev5 = Music Story
| rev5Score = 
| rev6 = MusicHound Rock| rev6Score = 5/5
| rev7 = Pitchfork| rev7score = 10/10
| rev8 = The Rolling Stone Album Guide| rev8Score = 
| rev9 = Uncut| rev9Score = 
}}

The album was met with widespread critical acclaim; Village Voice critic Robert Christgau felt that her voice, free of "technical decorum", would liberate female singers; while Jon Landau in Rolling Stone felt that King was one of the most creative pop music figures and had created an album of "surpassing personal-intimacy and musical accomplishment".

Awards
Along with being selected Album of the Year, it also received Grammys for Best Female Pop Vocal Performance, Record of the Year ("It's Too Late"), and Song of the Year ("You've Got a Friend"), making King the first solo female artist to win the Grammy Award for Record of the Year, and the first woman to win the Grammy Award for Song of the Year.

The album remained on the Billboard charts for 313 weeks (second only to Pink Floyd's 724 weeks with The Dark Side of the Moon).

Commercial performanceTapestry was a big commercial success. It spent 15 consecutive weeks at number one on the US Billboard 200. To date, Tapestry still holds the record for most consecutive weeks at number one by a female solo artist. The album also spent nearly 6 years charting US Billboard 200 (318 weeks), in which she also spent 302 consecutive weeks. For more than 40 years, Tapestry held the record for the longest charting album by a female solo artist in the US until Adele's 21 broke the record in 2017. It the fifth album to spend more weeks by female artist on the Billboard 200. In Canada, the album was on the Top 100 chart from April 14, 1971, to January 20, 1973, and again from September 22, 1973, to February 16, 1974. 

Tapestry was also very successful across the world. In Canada, it spent 9 weeks at number-one beginning July 3, 1971. In the United Kingdom, the album debuted at number thirty-two on UK Albums Chart but eventually rose to its peak at number four and went on to spend 136 weeks in the Top 100. Tapestry has reportedly sold over 7 million copies in its first year,  and around 30 million copies worldwide to date.

Cultural impact
Several songs from the album were recorded by other artists and became hits while the album was still on the charts: James Taylor's 1971 recording of "You've Got a Friend" hit number one in the US and number four in the UK, and Barbra Streisand's 1971 studio recording of "Where You Lead" reached number 40, while a live recording of a medley in which Streisand paired the song with the Sweet Inspirations hit "Sweet Inspiration" reached number 37 the following year.

Various artists combined to re-record all the original tracks for more than one tribute album. The first, released in 1995 and entitled Tapestry Revisited: A Tribute to Carole King, was certified gold. The second, in 2003, was entitled A New Tapestry – Carole King Tribute. In 2010 Australian recording artist Marcia Hines recorded a tribute album, Marcia Sings Tapestry.

"Her songs are like stories or sonic movies," observed Tori Amos. "You want to walk into them. With 'I Feel the Earth Move' or 'It's Too Late', you're right there."Tapestry frequently appears on critics' lists of the best albums. In 2003, it ranked number 36 on Rolling Stones 500 Greatest Albums of All Time, maintaining that rating in a 2012 revised list, but moving up to No. 25 in a 2020 update of the list. The album was also listed by VH1 at number 39 on their list of 100 Greatest Albums, and was one of 50 recordings chosen to be added to the National Recording Registry. Recordings added to the National Recording Registry are picked to be preserved in the Library of Congress as they are "culturally, historically, or aesthetically important." Based on such listings, Acclaimed Music ranks Tapestry as the 69th most acclaimed album in history.

In 2015, for its sixth and final season, American TV series Glee paid tribute to this album, alongside Alanis Morissette's Jagged Little Pill, in its episode "Jagged Little Tapestry" airing January 16, 2015. Five songs from this album is performed by various artists. Two of them performed on its own, "It's Too Late" and "So Far Away", while the other three are used in a mashup with one of the songs from Jagged Little Pill. "I Feel the Earth Move" is mashed up with "Hand in My Pocket", "Will You Love Me Tomorrow?" with "Head Over Feet", and "You've Got a Friend" with "You Learn". The episode was watched by 1.98 million viewers and received a 0.7/2 in the adult 18-49 demographic.

In March 2016 it was announced that Carole King would perform the album live in its entirety for the first time at the British Summer Time Festival in Hyde Park, London on July 3, 2016. The performance was released the following year as Tapestry: Live at Hyde Park''.

Track listing
All songs written by Carole King except where noted.

Side 1
 "I Feel the Earth Move" – 3:00
 "So Far Away" – 3:55
 "It's Too Late" (lyrics by Toni Stern) – 3:54
 "Home Again" – 2:29
 "Beautiful" – 3:08
 "Way Over Yonder" – 4:49

Side 2
"You've Got a Friend" – 5:09
 "Where You Lead" (King, Stern) – 3:20
 "Will You Love Me Tomorrow?" (Gerry Goffin, King) – 4:13
 "Smackwater Jack" (Goffin, King) – 3:42
 "Tapestry" – 3:15
 "(You Make Me Feel Like) A Natural Woman" (Goffin, King, Jerry Wexler) – 3:59

1999 CD reissue bonus tracks
"Out in the Cold" – 2:44
"Smackwater Jack" (Live in Boston, May 21, 1973) – 3:21

2008 "Legacy Edition"

In 2008, Sony/BMG, Epic, and Ode released a two-disc "Legacy Edition". One disc is the original album remastered; the second disc is live performances of 11 of the 12 songs, recorded in 1973 at Boston; Columbia, Maryland; and Central Park, New York; and in 1976 at the San Francisco Opera House. "Where You Lead" is the song not included on the live disc.

Live disc track listing
 "I Feel the Earth Move" – 4:17 
 "So Far Away" – 4:44
 "It's Too Late" – 5:06
 "Home Again" – 3:33
 "Beautiful" – 3:39
 "Way Over Yonder" – 5:35
 "You've Got a Friend" – 6:00
 "Will You Love Me Tomorrow?" – 4:31
 "Smackwater Jack" – 4:18
 "Tapestry" – 4:13
 "(You Make Me Feel Like) A Natural Woman" – 5:11

Personnel
Carole King – lead and backing vocals, piano, keyboards
Ralph Schuckett – electric piano
James Taylor – acoustic guitar, backing vocals
Danny "Kootch" Kortchmar – acoustic and electric guitars, congas, backing vocals
Perry Steinberg – bass guitar
Charles Larkey – bass guitar, string bass
Russ Kunkel – drums
Joel O'Brien – drums
Curtis Amy – flute; baritone, soprano and tenor saxophones
Barry Socher – violin
David Campbell – viola
Terry King – cello
Merry Clayton – backing vocals
Julia Tillman – backing vocals
Joni Mitchell – backing vocals on "Will You Love Me Tomorrow?"

Technical
Lou Adler – producer
Vic Anesini – mastering
Chuck Beeson – design
Hank Cicalo – engineering
Bob Irwin – production on 1999 re-release
Jessica Killorin – packaging manager
Jim McCrary – photography
Michael Putland – artwork
Smay Vision – design
Roland Young – art direction

Charts

Weekly charts
Original release

Year-end charts

Sales and certifications

See also
List of best-selling albums
List of best-selling albums by women

References

External links
 

1971 albums
Carole King albums
Albums produced by Lou Adler
Albums recorded at A&M Studios
Grammy Award for Album of the Year
Grammy Award for Best Female Pop Vocal Performance
United States National Recording Registry recordings
United States National Recording Registry albums
Ode Records albums